Pine Meadow Lake is a  lake in Rockland County, New York. It is located at the end of the  Pine Meadow Trail in Harriman State Park.

History
The area was inhabited as early as 1724 by Nicholas Conklin, and his descendants had several cabins on the land when the Palisades Interstate Park Commission acquired the land for the Harriman State Park.  The dam that created the lake was built by Civilian Conservation Corps labor under William A. Welch of the Park Commission.  The lake was built as part of a collection of cabins, roads, a water system and incinerator.  Thirty-five camps were planned but most were never built; none exist presently.

References

Myles, William J., Harriman Trails, A Guide and History, The New York-New Jersey Trail Conference, New York, N.Y., 1999.

Lakes of Rockland County, New York
Harriman State Park (New York)
Civilian Conservation Corps in New York (state)
Lakes of New York (state)